Stoddard is an unincorporated community in Stoddard County, in the U.S. state of Missouri.

Stoddard had its start in the 1890s.  The community was named after Stoddard County.

References

Unincorporated communities in Stoddard County, Missouri
Unincorporated communities in Missouri
1890s establishments in Missouri